The Classic Collection is a greatest hits compilation by Australian rock group Little River Band, released in November 1992.

The album peaked at number one in New Zealand in 1993 and at number eight on the ARIA chart in 1995 where it was certified platinum.

Track listing

Charts

Weekly charts

Year-end charts

Certifications

See also
 List of number-one albums from the 1990s (New Zealand)

References

1992 greatest hits albums
Little River Band albums
Compilation albums by Australian artists
EMI Records compilation albums